The Uzbek Ground Forces are the land component of the Armed Forces of the Republic of Uzbekistan. Operating since the collapse of the Soviet Union in 1991, the army is made up of former Soviet Army units that were in the territory of Uzbekistan. As of 2006, it had around 40,000 active personnel. Much of the equipment it uses is also old Soviet material, and the government of Uzbekistan has not given much effort to replace it with modern equipment.

History
The armed forces were created in 1992, and along with the army, the air and air defense forces, national guard, and border service were created. Islam Karimov, the President of Uzbekistan, had begun calling native Uzbeks in the Soviet Armed Forces back to Uzbekistan to fill the ranks of the newly created ground forces, though many refused to return and renounced their citizenship. Russians made up the majority of the officer corps, while the enlisted personnel were mainly Uzbek.

Uzbekistan then became the only Central Asian state that did not allow Russian Federation citizens to serve in the army, and began to replace the Slavic officers with ethnic Uzbeks. At independence, Slavic officers made up the command of the army, and thus an effort was made to give Uzbeks higher positions, giving Slavics lower ranks. The Slavs who stayed in Uzbekistan accepted Uzbek passports.

Three major Soviet military academies, the Tashkent Higher All-Arms Command School, the Chirchiq Higher Tank Command and Engineering School, and the Samarkand Higher Military Automobile Command School, were located in Uzbekistan. This caused the government to not send Uzbek officers to Russia for training. In 1994, they established the joint Armed Forces Academy, to train officers of all branches. Though the Uzbek language was becoming more in use by the army, Russian remained the main language used in training officers, due to the fact that most manuals were in Russian and that the Central Asian Turkic languages did not have proper military vocabulary.

In 1997, the United States CENTRASBAT program paid over $5 million to fund a training exercise between Uzbek and American troops that were going to be stationed in the country. Later in 1998, a US general attended an Uzbek base that had a unit which took part in the training. After asking for a show of hands of who took part in it, only two raised them. Most Uzbek soldiers leave the service when their mandatory conscription ends. The US forces have found this to be the case in Kyrgyzstan and Kazakhstan as well. The army was similarly run to the Soviet one, in terms of command, service, and equipment. Senior commanders gave strict orders that allowed little freedom of decision.

In 2003, the defense ministry announced that the conscription time was lowered from 18 months to 12, and those who attended officer schools only had to serve nine months. It was encouraging higher ranking personnel to serve longer. Many young Uzbeks bribed recruitment officials to not draft them into the army, as dedovshchina was widespread.

Organization

Districts 
The Army includes five military districts, the Northwest at Nukus, the Southwest Special Military District at Karshi, the Central Military District at Dzhizak, and the Eastern Military District at Ferghana. In 2001, the Tashkent Garrison was transformed into the Tashkent Military District.

Specialties 

 Motor Rifle Units
 Tank Forces
 Special Operations Forces 
 Reconnaissance
 Engineering
 Chemical units
 Signals
 Electronic warfare units
 Logistics
 Topogeodetic

List of Formations 
There are four motor rifle brigades, and the 17th Air Assault Brigade at Fergana (the former 387th Airborne Training Regiment of the Soviet Airborne Forces). Motorized brigades are located around Bukhara, Samarqand, Termez, Nukus, and Andijan. The subordinate brigades listed below have been attributed to the various military districts either because they are located in the same city as the military district headquarters or are clearly within the military districts' area of responsibility.

Army Headquarters (Tashkent) 

 Honor Guard Battalion of the Tashkent Military District
 Engineering Brigade
 Special Forces Battalion of the Eastern Military District "Lynx"

Regular Army 

 Training Regiment (Chirchik)
 387th Airborne Training Regiment
 17th Air Assault Brigade at (Fergana) - Consists of up to 5000 soldiers, was formerly the Soviet 105th Guards Vienna Airborne Division.
 1st Motor Rifle Brigade (Chirchik)
 2nd Motor Rifle Brigade (Samarqand)
 3rd Motor Rifle Brigade (Termez)
 25th Motor Rifle Brigade (Karshi, Military Unit No.08579)
 37th Motor Rifle Brigade (Andijan)
15th Independent Special Forces Brigade
 Tank Regiment (Ahangaran)

Facilities 
 Kattakurgan Training Ground
Gurumsaray Training Ground
Farish Mountain Training Area
Shorsu Training Ground
Angren Training Ground
Nuristan Training Ground
Termez Training Ground
Nukus Training Ground

Exercises

Uzbek troops participated in Partnership for Peace Exercise Cooperative Osprey '96 at Camp Lejeune in North Carolina, hosted by the United States Marine Corps. They then participated as well in Exercise Cooperative Osprey '98.

In September 2004, the (then) Royal Welsh Regiment (now 3rd Bn The Royal Welsh) of the British Army participated with the Uzbek Army Peacekeeping Battalion in "Exercise Timurlane Express" in the Farish Mountain Training Area. This was a 3-week NATO sponsored Partnership for Peace training exercise.

Current equipment

Reportedly, Uzbek armed forces' small arms include the AK-47, AK-74, Dragunov sniper rifle, Makarov PM pistol and PK.

References

Government of Uzbekistan
Military of Uzbekistan